Mihangel Morgan (born Michael Finch on 7 December 1955 in Trecynon, near Aberdare, Rhondda Cynon Taf) is a Welsh author.

Background and career
He changed his name from Michael Finch to Mihangel Morgan in his early twenties, taking his mother's maiden name. 
His work often reflects Welsh academia and the crisis of Welsh culture and many actual figures are easily recognised in some of his works.  References to key moments in Welsh literature speckle his work; e.g. Dan Gadarn Goncrit is a reference to the Artist in Philistia theme from a political Welsh poem about Saunders Lewis.
Born in the village of Trecynon, near Aberdare in South Wales, he lectures in 20th-century Welsh literature, working for the Welsh Department at Aberystwyth University.

Morgan is considered to be "one of Wales's leading Welsh language novelists"

He lives near the small village of Tal-y-bont, Ceredigion.

Bibliography
 Diflaniad Fy Fi (Cyhoeddiadau Barddas, 1988) poems
 Beth yw Rhif Ffôn Duw?   (Cyhoeddiadau Barddas, 1991) poems
 Hen Lwybr A Storïau Eraill   (Gomer, 1992) short stories
 Dirgel Ddyn (Gomer, 1993) novel
 Saith Pechod Marwol (Y Lolfa, 1993) 'sin'-themed short stories
 Te Gyda'r Frenhines (Gomer, 1994) gay-themed short stories
 Tair Ochr y Geiniog (Gomer, 1996) gay-themed short stories
 Jane Edwards (Gwasg Pantycelyn, 1996) academic study
 Melog (Gomer, 1997) novel
 Darllen Ffilmiau (Prifysgol Cymru Aberystwyth, 1998) academic study
 Dan Gadarn Goncrit (Y Lolfa, 1999) novel
 Y Corff Yn Y Parc (Gwasg Carreg Cwalch, 1999) short stories
 Caradog Prichard (Gwasg Pantycelyn, 2000) academic study
 Cathod a Chŵn (Y Lolfa, 2000) short stories
 Modrybedd Afradlon (Gomer, 2000) short story
 Creision Hud (with Jo Feldwick) (Y Lolfa, 2001) poems for children
 Y Ddynes Ddirgel (Y Lolfa, 2001) novel
 Pan Oeddwn Fachgen (Y Lolfa, 2002) novel
 Croniclau Pentre Simon (Y Lolfa, 2003) novel
 Digon O Fwydod (Cyhoeddiadau Barddas, 2005) poems for children
 Cestyll yn y Cymylau (Y Lolfa, 2007) novel
 Pantglas (Y Lolfa, 2011) novel
 60 (Y Lolfa, 2017) novel

References

External links 
Dr Morgan's home page at Aberystwyth University Welsh Department
Mihangel, BBC

1959 births
Academics of Aberystwyth University
Living people
People from Aberdare
Welsh-language writers
Welsh novelists